Moon Lake is a lake in Berrien County, in the U.S. state of Michigan.

Moon Lake has the name of Zimri Moon, the original owner of the site.

References

Lakes of Berrien County, Michigan